Salix Homes is a housing association in the City of Salford, Greater Manchester and based in the Langworthy area of the city. It manages 10,500 homes in the Central Salford part of the district which includes Claremont, Weaste, Seedley, Kersal, Charlestown, Broughton, Ordsall, Langworthy, Islington and Pendleton.

Safety
In 2013, Salix was criticised for failing to take action to prevent the risk of fire in Whitebeam Court, a tower block in Pendleton.

Coppers
In 2013 Salix Homes signed up to a new initiative to combat crime and Anti social Behaviour in the City of Salford, it is part of a wider scheme for the county of Greater Manchester. This will see both Salix Homes and Greater Manchester Police work closer together and share intelligence. Greater Manchester Police Assistant Chief Constable Garry Shewan said: “This agreement lays the foundation for a stronger working relationship between the police and social housing sector across Greater Manchester. It will mean that the resources, energy and talent within the partnership can be used effectively to help reduce crime and anti-social behaviour within our communities, protect vulnerable people and provide greater support for victims of crime.”

References

External links
 

Housing associations based in England
Organisations based in Salford